FC Black Stars Basel is a football club from Basel, Switzerland.

Since the season 2012/2013 they play in Group 2 of the 1. Liga Classic, the fourth tier of Swiss football. They were promoted to the third tier in 2019.

Current squad
As of 19 January, 2022.

References

External links
 
   Official Website.

Association football clubs established in 1907
Football clubs in Switzerland
FC Black Stars Basel
Sport in Basel